Edwin Moliki Mulitalo (born September 1, 1974) is an American football coach and former player. He was drafted by the Baltimore Ravens in the fourth round of the 1999 NFL Draft. He played college football at Arizona. Mulitalo earned a Super Bowl ring with the Ravens in Super Bowl XXXV. He also played for the Detroit Lions. Mulitalo served as the head football coach at Southern Virginia University in Buena Vista, Virginia from 2018 to 2022.

Early years
Mulitalo attended Jefferson High School (Daly City, CA) and was a letterman in football, wrestling, and track and field. Mulitalo graduated in 1992.

College career
Mulitalo played his last two college years at the University of Arizona. Before that he was at Ricks College in Rexburg Idaho (now BYU-Idaho).

NFL career

Baltimore Ravens
Making his National Football League debut as a guard for the Baltimore Ravens in 1999, Mulitalo quickly earned a starting spot. Mulitalo earned a Super Bowl ring when the Ravens won Super Bowl XXXV in the 2000 season. He played for Baltimore all the way to 2006.

Detroit Lions
Mulitalo was with the Detroit Lions for the next two years, being plagued by injuries. He was released following the 2008 season, having worn No. 64 through his entire NFL career.

Coaching career
Mulitalo began his coaching career at Southern Utah University as a volunteer offensive line coach when the Thunderbirds won the Big Sky Conference championship in 2015. He was appointed defensive line coach at Southern Virginia University on February 26, 2016. He was promoted to head coach two years later on March 30, 2018.

Personal life
Mulitalo is a devout member of the Church of Jesus Christ of Latter-day Saints. He served a two-year LDS Mission in Idaho.  Mulitalo  and his wife, Laura, resided in Herriman, Utah with their four children, before moving to Samoan island of Upolu in 2012. He was employed as a teacher there.

Mulitalo was present during the Ravens Super Bowl XXXV reunion in 2010.

Head coaching record

References

1974 births
Living people
American football offensive guards
American football offensive tackles
Arizona Wildcats football players
Baltimore Ravens players
Detroit Lions players
Southern Virginia Knights football coaches
People from Herriman, Utah
Players of American football from California
People from Daly City, California
Latter Day Saints from California
American sportspeople of Samoan descent
Sportspeople from the San Francisco Bay Area